Macclenny is a city in Baker County, Florida . Located just west of Jacksonville, it is one of the principal municipalities comprising Greater Jacksonville. The population was 7,304 at the 2020 census, up from 6,374 in 2010. It is the county seat of Baker County.

History

Macclenny was first called Darbyville because most of the land of this area was owned by the Darby family. Carr Bowers McClenny married into the Darby family, and then bought most of this land in the late 19th century, intending to harvest it for timber.

Darbyville became known as McClenny. McClenny developed many businesses there related to lumber: harvesting the wood, sawmills to process it, turpentine, and land. The town name McClenny was changed to the current name of The City of  Macclenny because the post office department had a rule against using capital letters in the middle of a name. The first post office in Macclenny was established in 1890.

There were settlers in Macclenny as early as 1829, but it was not until after the Civil War that more people began to settle there. In 1888 most of the town residents were killed in a yellow fever epidemic. The population was 334 in 1890 (see census table below). The town gradually recovered.

By 2000, residents increased to 4,500. The 2016 population was estimated at 6,562. (See census table below).

Geography

U.S. Route 90 (Macclenny Avenue) runs through the center of town, and Interstate 10 passes through the southern tip of the town, with access from Exit 335 (State Road 121).

Demographics

At the 2000 census there were 4,459 people in 1,548 households, including 1,140 families, in the city. The racial makeup of the city was 75.89% White, 21.87% African American, 0.36% Native American, 0.67% Asian, 0.07% Pacific Islander, 0.45% from other races, and 0.70% from two or more races. Hispanic or Latino of any race were 2.47%.

Of the 1,548 households 38.4% had children under the age of 18 living with them, 49.5% were married couples living together, 20.5% had a female householder with no husband present, and 26.3% were non-families. 23.0% of households were one person and 10.7% were one person aged 65 or older. The average household size was 2.70 and the average family size was 3.17.

The age distribution was 28.9% under the age of 18, 12.4% from 18 to 24, 25.5% from 25 to 44, 18.8% from 45 to 64, and 14.4% 65 or older. The median age was 32 years. For every 100 females, there were 90 males. For every 100 females age 18 and over, there were 85 males.

The median household income was $31,895 and the median family income  was $37,091. Males had a median income of $26,775 versus $19,573 for females. The per capita income for the city was $14,909. About 17.1% of families and 20.9% of the population were below the poverty line, including 37.4% of those under age 18 and 10.2% of those age 65 or over.

References

External links

City of Macclenny official website
Baker County Press, newspaper that serves Macclenny, Florida, available for free in full-text with images in Florida Digital Newspaper Library

County seats in Florida
Cities in Baker County, Florida
Cities in the Jacksonville metropolitan area
Cities in Florida